Green Bay Correctional Institution (GBCI) is an adult male maximum-security correctional facility operated by the Wisconsin Department of Corrections Division of Adult Institutions in Allouez, Wisconsin. The prison is located along the east bank of the Fox River.

History

The prison was originally known as the "Wisconsin State Reformatory" (WSR). In 1972, WSR became an adult male, maximum-security prison. The name was changed to the Green Bay Correctional Institution on July 1, 1979.

The prison was listed on the National Register of Historic Places as the "Wisconsin State Reformatory" in 1990.

In 2022, the United States Court of Appeals for the Seventh Circuit involked the Religious Land Use and Institutionalized Persons Act in its ruling that the rights of a Muslim prisoner at Green Bay Correctional Institution were unlawfully violated when he was strip searched by a transgender male guard.

References

External links 
Green Bay Correctional Institution

Jails on the National Register of Historic Places in Wisconsin
Italianate architecture in Wisconsin
Romanesque Revival architecture in Wisconsin
1898 establishments in Wisconsin
Prisons in Wisconsin
Buildings and structures in Brown County, Wisconsin
Historic districts on the National Register of Historic Places in Wisconsin
National Register of Historic Places in Brown County, Wisconsin